The canton of Haute-Ardèche (before 2016: canton of Thueyts) is an administrative division of the Ardèche department, southern France. Its borders were modified at the French canton reorganisation which came into effect in March 2015. Its seat is in Thueyts.

It consists of the following communes:
 
Astet
Barnas
Le Béage
Borne
Burzet
Cellier-du-Luc
Chirols
Coucouron
Cros-de-Géorand
Fabras
Issanlas
Issarlès
Jaujac
Le Lac-d'Issarlès
Lachapelle-Graillouse
Lalevade-d'Ardèche
Lanarce
Laveyrune
Lavillatte
Lespéron
Mayres
Mazan-l'Abbaye
Meyras
Montpezat-sous-Bauzon
Péreyres
Le Plagnal
Pont-de-Labeaume
Prades
Le Roux
Sagnes-et-Goudoulet
Saint-Alban-en-Montagne
Saint-Cirgues-de-Prades
Saint-Cirgues-en-Montagne
Sainte-Eulalie
Saint-Étienne-de-Lugdarès
Saint-Laurent-les-Bains-Laval-d'Aurelle
Saint-Pierre-de-Colombier
La Souche
Thueyts
Usclades-et-Rieutord

References

Cantons of Ardèche